Sir John Burgoyne, 1st Baronet (c. 1592–1657) was an English politician who sat in the House of Commons  from 1645 to 1648. He supported the Parliamentarian cause in the English Civil War.

Burgoyne was the son of  Roger Burgoyne, of Sutton, Bedfordshire, and Wroxall, Warwickshire and his wife Margaret Wendy, daughter of Thomas Wendy, of Haslingfield, Cambridgeshire. He was baptised at Haslingfield on 29 January 1592. He was admitted at Emmanuel College, Cambridge on 16 April 1607 and admitted at the Middle Temple in October 1611.  His father, who was twice a High Sheriff acquired the estate of Honily at Sutton in 1625 and built Old Honily Hall.  Burgoyne succeeded to the estates on the death of his father in 1636. He was  High Sheriff of Bedfordshire in 1640 and was created a baronet of Sutton on 15 July 1641.

In 1645, Burgoyne was elected Member of Parliament for Warwickshire in the Long Parliament. He sat until 1648 when he was excluded under Pride's Purge.
 
Burgoyne died at the age of 65.

Burgoyne married Jane Kempe, daughter of Julius Kempe, of Spains Hall, Finchingfield, Essex, by whom he had four daughters and three sons. His son Roger succeeded him in the baronetcy.

References

1590s births
1657 deaths
English MPs 1640–1648
High Sheriffs of Bedfordshire
Members of the Middle Temple
People from Warwickshire (before 1974)
Alumni of Emmanuel College, Cambridge
Roundheads
Year of birth uncertain
Baronets in the Baronetage of England
People from Sutton, Bedfordshire